Go! My Heaven is the 10th single from the Japanese singer Hayami Kishimoto, released on October 18, 2006. The single contains the lead track Go! My Heaven, two b-side tracks titled Fake Happy End and Shadow or Light?, and one instrumental for the lead track.

CD track listing

Go! My Heaven
Fake Happy End
Shadow or Light?
Go! My Heaven -Instrumental-

Music video
The music video for Go! My Heaven is set in a dimly lit room in which Kishimoto can be seen dancing while changing through a number of outfits. One other scene in the video shows Kishimoto sitting on a couch alone while looking into the camera and singing.

References

2006 singles
Hayami Kishimoto songs
2006 songs
Giza Studio singles